Goeppertia allouia (syn. Calathea allouia), known as lerén or lairén in Spanish, and also known in English as Guinea arrowroot, and sweet corn root, is a plant in the arrowroot family, native to northern South America and the Caribbean, The name "allouia" is derived from the Carib name for the plant Leren is a minor food crop in the American tropics, but was one of the earliest plants domesticated by pre-historic Amerindians in South America.

Distribution
Goeppertia allouia is native to Cuba, Hispaniola, Puerto Rico, the Lesser Antilles, Trinidad & Tobago, Venezuela, Colombia, Ecuador, Peru and Brazil. It is reportedly naturalized in Jamaica

Leren has been introduced as a minor root crop in tropical regions around the world.

Description

Indigenous people of the Americas have used the durable leaves to make traditional medicines and as baby clothing. Leren usually reproduces itself through rhizomes which produce shoots and new plants.

Cultivation

Leren is adapted to a tropical climate with alternating rainy and dry seasons.  It sprouts with the first rains and grows rapidly, forming tubers which are harvested as the foliage begins to die back eight or nine months after the initial sprouting.  The rhizomes, harvested at the same time, are tolerant of both drying and flooding, and divided and replanted again at the onset of the rainy season.  Frequent irrigation is necessary during dry periods.  Leren is often planted in shade or partial shade but can grow in full sun with adequate moisture and nutrients.

Leren is traditionally cultivated on a small scale.  Its cultivation is declining as it has been replaced by other crops.

Food

Leren is usually cooked by boiling the tubers for 15 to 60 minutes,  As food, leren is often compared to water chestnut (Eleocharis dulcis) because leren, like the water chestnut, retains its crispness despite being cooked. Boiled leren has a taste similar to sweet corn, hence one of its common English names. The cooked tuber is covered with a thin, edible skin which is most easily peeled after cooking. Leren is mostly eaten as an hors d'oeuvre or appetizer. Leren tubers can be stored at room temperatures for up to three months, but do not tolerate refrigeration well.

The nutritional value of leren has not been thoroughly studied, but the tubers have a starch content of 13-15 percent and a protein content of 6.6 percent.

Prehistoric domestication

Archaeologists have discovered that leren was one of the first plants domesticated in prehistoric South America. Leren, along with arrowroot (Maranta arundinacea), squash (Cucurbita moschata), and bottle gourd (Lagenaria siceraria) were being eaten and possibly cultivated in Colombia by about 9000 BCE. It appears that the cultivation of leren spread to places where it was not likely native.  For example, the people of the Las Vegas culture on the arid and semi-arid Santa Elena Peninsula of Ecuador likely grew leren by about 9000 BCE. Leren was being grown to be eaten raw, dried, or ground into flour.

References

allouia
Root vegetables
Edible plants
Plants described in 1829
Flora of Cuba
Flora of Haiti
Flora of the Dominican Republic
Flora of Puerto Rico
Flora of the Windward Islands
Flora of the Leeward Islands
Flora of Trinidad and Tobago
Flora of Venezuela
Flora of Colombia
Flora of Ecuador
Flora of Peru
Flora of Brazil
Plants used in Native American cuisine
Early agriculture in Mesoamerica
Tropical agriculture
Mesoamerican cuisine
Native American cuisine
Crops originating from South America
Flora without expected TNC conservation status